Haberlandia entebbeensis is a moth in the family Cossidae. It is found in Uganda. The habitat consists of lowland rainforests.

The wingspan is about 23 mm. The forewings are pale orange yellow with buckthorn-brown lines and striae from the costal margin to the dorsum. The hindwings are deep colonial buff with a reticulated (net-like) buckthorn-brown pattern.

Etymology
The species is named for Entebbe, the type locality.

References

Natural History Museum Lepidoptera generic names catalog

Endemic fauna of Uganda
Moths described in 2011
Metarbelinae
Taxa named by Ingo Lehmann